Ahijah was a Jewish Exilarch of the 2nd century AD. There are no known holders of the office prior to his tenure. His name does not appear in the Seder Olam Zutta. He is potentially the son of Akkub who is commonly noted in contemporary Jewish genealogies.

See also
Exilarch
Seder Olam Zutta

References

External links
Jewish Encyclopedia- Exilarch

Exilarchs
2nd-century Jews
Jewish royalty